Wellsville is a Town and largest community in Allegany County, New York, United States. As of the 2020 census, the town had a population of 7,099.

Wellsville is also the name of the main village within this town. The village and the town have two separate, paid governments.

History

Originally an encampment for native peoples, Wellsville's settlement was driven, first, by the tanning and lumber industries and, later, the discovery of oil and natural gas.

Wellsville was the location of encampments for thousands of years, including the Lamoka and Brewerton cultures. The latest native people, the Seneca, named Wellsville Gistaguat, according to a map produced in 1771 by Guy Johnson, as the official map of New York state at the time, for then-Governor William Tryon. The Seneca referred to the Wellsville area as "the Pigeon Woods" and held annual festivals and encampments there to take advantage of the passenger pigeon (see memoirs of Captain Horatio Jones). At the time, passenger pigeons filled the skies by the millions, and the tribes and bands came to the Wellsville area from all over western New York and northern Pennsylvania to Gistaquat to harvest the pigeons by the thousands.

European settlers moved into the area before 1800. Nathaniel Dyke, a native of Connecticut, and a captain in the Revolutionary War, serving under both General George Washington and General Warren of Bunker Hill fame, was the first of these in Allegany County. He married a Native American woman (Esther) and moved his family to the Wellsville area by 1795, while it was still owned by the Seneca Nation (two years before the Big Tree Treaty of 1797). He began running a gristmill, a sawmill, and a tannery on a stream now known as Dykes Creek, by 1803. Dyke is buried in Elm Valley, just east of town. His tombstone has the official memorial placed there by the Catherine Schuyler Chapter of the Daughters of the American Revolution.

Wellsville's first industry was tanning, utilizing the bark of the hemlock tree for its tannins. Three large tanneries operated in Wellsville during the early 19th century. Next came the lumbermen and the railroad. The New York and Erie Railroad came through what would become Wellsville (then the outskirts of Scio) in 1851 as the quickest way west from New York City, crossing New York state. This proved that Nathaniel Dyke's choice of location was the quickest, easiest and most practical way across Allegany County. The trains gave the lumbermen a new and more efficient means to get their product to market. Prior to this, the logs had been floated on the rivers and canals. Logging moved on to more densely forested areas in the latter part of the 19th century but the cleared ground quickly produced excellent grazing for a tremendous dairy industry which followed.

Wellsville was named after a man named Gardiner Wells, who was, according to local history, the one person who didn't show up for the meeting when the residents were naming the town. Wells was the major landowner of the real estate pieces, now the downtown Main Street section of Wellsville. The first oil boom came later in Wellsville's history, several decades after the founding of the town and village when oil was discovered in Wellsville in 1879 by O.P. Taylor in his famous "Triangle No. 1" well in Petrolia, west of Wellsville. A second boom occurred with the discovery of "Secondary Recovery", led by Bradley Producing, based in Wellsville. The method uses water, so abundant in Wellsville, to force the oil from the "oil sands". The Sinclair Refinery was built in Wellsville at the beginning of the 20th century, not closing down until 1957 after two major fires and falling oil prices.

Since World War II, Wellsville's economy has been dominated by skilled engineering and manufacturing with a cluster of multinational companies in the energy sector. It also has a cluster of ceramic artists and artisans fed by its proximity to Alfred University's ceramics school.

The area that is now Wellsville was part of Scio through the first half of the 19th century. It was incorporated as Wellsville and set apart from Scio in 1857. For a brief time during the early 1870s, Wellsville changed its name to "Genesee". On April 4, 1871, the New York State Legislature officially changed Wellsville's name to Genesee. After much political wrangling, by a special act of the legislature, the name Wellsville was again designated as the official name of the town, June 8, 1873. The village of Wellsville was first incorporated in 1857 and then again in 1873.

Wellsville is the junction of many foothill streams including Dyke Creek feeding the Genesee River from the east. The water from Hurricane Agnes in 1972 exceeded the capacity and banks of Dyke Creek, producing a rapid and huge pool of water at the center of the village. The extent of the damaged area continued downstream through Scio and Amity until the valley widened to accept the large flow of water in the lesser populated area. Erosion of topsoil during this flood eliminated many small farms.

The US Post Office-Wellsville, built by the Works Progress Administration during the Great Depression in the art deco style, was listed on the National Register of Historic Places in 1989.[5]

The Wellsville Erie Depot is a historic train station located at Wellsville in Allegany County, New York. It was constructed in 1911, for the Erie Railroad. It is a one-story, 132-foot (40 m) by 33-foot (10 m) structure displaying elements of the Queen Anne and Romanesque Revival styles popular in the late 19th and early 20th century. It is located across the street from the US Post Office-Wellsville. It was listed on the National Register of Historic Places in 1987.

In March 2006, a referendum to dissolve the village was defeated by the residents. At present, local officials are attempting to obtain a charter for the community to reorganize both municipalities into one entity, a city.

Geography

The Genesee River flows northward through the town.

New York State Route 417 intersects New York State Route 19 at Wellsville village, and NY 19 intersects New York State Route 248 by the south town line in Stannards.

Demographics

As of the census of 2000, there were 7,678 people, 3,192 households, and 1,924 families residing in the town. The population density was 209.4 people per square mile (80.9/km2). There were 3,606 housing units at an average density of 98.4 per square mile (38.0/km2). The racial makeup of the town was 96.65% White, 0.53% Black or African American, 0.26% Native American, 1.24% Asian, 0.00% Pacific Islander, 0.21% from other races, and 1.11% from two or more races. 0.72% of the population were Hispanic or Latino of any race.

There were 3,192 households, out of which 26.9% had children under the age of 18 living with them, 46.9% were married couples living together, 9.9% had a female householder with no husband present, and 39.7% were non-families. 33.6% of all households were made up of individuals, and 15.2% had someone living alone who was 65 years of age or older. The average household size was 2.29 and the average family size was 2.92.

In the town, the population was spread out, with 22.9% under the age of 18, 7.5% from 18 to 24, 25.2% from 25 to 44, 23.7% from 45 to 64, and 20.7% who were 65 years of age or older. The median age was 41 years. For every 100 females, there were 90.4 males. For every 100 females age 18 and over, there were 86.5 males.

The median income for a household in the town was $30,098, and the median income for a family was $39,705. Males had a median income of $36,302 versus $23,387 for females. The per capita income for the town was $18,744. 16.0% of the population and 10.6% of families were below the poverty line. 17.9% of those under the age of 18 and 9.2% of those 65 and older were living below the poverty line.

Economy
Wellsville's economy is dominated by skilled engineering and manufacturing with a cluster of companies in the energy sector. Its close proximity to prominent engineering schools at Alfred University, Rochester Institute of Technology and the University of Rochester has resulted in a high concentration of highly skilled and specialized engineers.

Ljungstrom, a division of The Arvos Group, (formerly Alstom Power Air Preheater) designs and manufactures in Wellsville products for the thermal power plant market, namely air preheaters and gas-gas heaters for thermal power generation facilities. As such, they are an innovator in the development of "clean coal technology."

Current Controls, founded in 1982, operates as a general contractor that specializes in bridge production. Operates primarily in New York State and Pennsylvania with another division located in Atlanta, GA.

The LC Whitford Company, founded in 1916, designs and manufactures electronic transformers, inductors and serves the automotive, aerospace, medical, data storage, lighting, power supply industries.

Northern Lights Candle Co., a manufacturer, retailer and wholesale distributor of candles and novelties, is headquartered in Wellsville.

Otis Eastern Services, founded in 1936, serves the oil and gas industries, constructing, upgrading and maintaining oil and gas distribution systems such as pipelines in West Virginia, New York, New Jersey, Connecticut, and Massachusetts.

Release Coatings of NY, headquartered in Wellsville, is world leader in the development and production of state-of-the-art, water-based release agents including flex and rigid mandrel and mold releases agents and hose, tube, or pan cure release agents.

Education

Primary and secondary schools
Wellsville Central School District serves pre-K-12 on two campuses. In 2004, the district completed a multimillion-dollar building project creating a new middle school, additions to the high and elementary schools, and a new swimming pool. In 2010, the district upgraded the elementary school and athletic fields, complete with a multi-purpose, all-weather stadium. The Wellsville High School's newspaper, The Owl, was founded in 1907 and is one of the longest-running student newspapers in New York State.

Wellsville is also home to the Immaculate Conception School (ICS) of Allegany County, a Diocesan regional school, ranked No. 5 of 194 middle schools in Western New York by the Buffalo-based Business First.

Colleges
Wellsville is home to Alfred State College's School of Applied Technology which includes the Culinary Arts School, automotive department, building trades, and a Sustainable Advanced Manufacturing Center (SAMC) opened in 2016.

Public libraries

The David A. Howe Library, a member of the Southern Tier Library System, is the largest public library in Allegany County and the cultural center of Wellsville. Built in 1910 in the Georgian style, the brick building enjoys much natural light because of the large Palladian windows and still retains much of its original custom furnishings such as cork flooring, original carved oak wood ornamentation, and child-sized furniture in the children's wing. In addition to several large reading rooms, the facility includes a large exhibition room, two terraces, local history room, meeting rooms, kitchen, and the 301-person Nancy Howe Auditorium which is often used for concerts, plays, movies, and meetings. In 2017 the library was awarded the EBSCO Excellence in Rural Library Service Award by the Public Library Association and EBSCO Information Services.

Local landmarks

The Pink House
The Pink House is an Italianate-Revival mansion built in 1869 and located on the corner of West State Street and South Brooklyn Avenue. It is renowned for its architecture as well as for the ghost story attached to it. Many stories purport that the house is haunted by the ghost of a girl who drowned in the front fountain as well as her aunt, Mary Francis Farnum, who committed suicide in a nearby mill race after a failed love affair and whose tragic demise was the inspiration for Hanford Lennox Gordon's famous poem "Pauline." The Pink House enjoys another literary association, as the setting for the 1987 Emmy-Award-winning film The Birthmark, based on Nathaniel Hawthorne's short story of the same name. Exterior and interior scenes were filmed at the Pink House. The Pink House is a private residence still owned by descendants of the original owners.

Events and entertainment

The Great Wellsville Balloon Rally

The Great Wellsville Balloon Rally is the largest annual event in the Wellsville area, attracting hot air balloonists and tourists from many parts of the country who participate in the event on the third full weekend of every July. The rally was started by Ray Stevens in 1975. The event has received coverage by the national media, including the Today show and is beloved by balloonists and spectators alike.

Ridgewalk & Run
The Ridgewalk & Run trail race event has been staged every year since 1993. Held in October, the event showcases fall foliage and highlights the area's oil industry. The 2008 event included a 5K and 10K trail run and a more challenging 14-mile trail run. Participants could also choose to enter one of the walking races of 2, 6, 9 or 14 miles.

Wellsville Creative Arts Center
The Wellsville Creative Arts Center opened on September 9, 2006, in the old Carter Hardware building downtown. Entrepreneur Andy Glanzman's addition to the downtown provides classes in ceramics and cooking. The center also includes the Coffee House where live music shows are staged almost every weekend.

Great Wellsville Trout Derby
The Great Wellsville Trout Derby is hosted by the Wellsville Lions Club during the last full weekend in April.

Notable people

Nick Anderson, frontman of the pop rock band the Wrecks. The band's sophomore EP Panic Vertigo was also produced on a ranch in Wellsville.
Kristin Beck, former, honorary, United States Navy SEAL, who gained public attention in 2013 when she came out as a trans woman. Kristin continues to pave the way for tolerance and acceptance of the LGBT community.
William B. Duke, horse trainer, won the 1925 Kentucky Derby and the 1925 Preakness Stakes. Inducted in U.S Racing Hall of Fame.
Drew "Bear" Evans, film and stage producer. Known recently for the film "A Walk with Grace" and his previous work with the Production Resource Group (PRG).
George "Gabby" Hayes, actor in many western movies
Billy Packer, former sports broadcaster and author, born in Wellsville
Jack Stevenson, author, film showman,  born in Wellsville
John Rigas, founder of Adelphia Communications Corporation, former owner of Buffalo Sabres
Ted Taylor, nuclear physicist who became a nuclear disarmament advocate
Charles Monroe Sheldon (minister), and leader of the Social Gospel movement.

In popular culture
The Nickelodeon television series The Adventures of Pete & Pete, which ran from 1993 to 1996, is set in a fictionalized version of Wellsville. Though the state is never explicitly mentioned, New York license plates can be seen at various points in the series, and geographic clues indicate the show's setting is in New York or that vicinity. The show was taped at various locations in North Jersey.

Communities and locations in the Town of Wellsville
Dykes Creek – A stream that joins the Genesee River in Wellsville village, named after Allegany County's and Wellsville's first settler, Nathaniel Dike. (But the spelling on modern maps has been corrupted.)
Pink House – Large pink mansion located near Main Street and Wellsville Middle High School. Created by E.B. Hall for his wife.
Elm Valley – A hamlet by the east town line on Route 417.
Sunnydale/Proctor District – A neighborhood dominated by post-war homes located near Ljungstrom's Andover Road manufacturing facility.
Norton Summit – A location west of the airport on the town line.
Stannards – A hamlet on the south town line, south of Wellsville village at the junction of Route 19 and route 248.
Wellsville – The Village of Wellsville is at the Genesee River and the intersection of Routes 19 and 417.
Wellsville Municipal Airport, Tarantine Field (ELZ) – A general aviation airport, which also provides charter services, is located on a hill west of Wellsville village.
Petrolia

References

External links

Town of Wellsville official website
Wellsville Airport
Short historical note about Wellsville
Wellsville Central School
The Great Wellsville Balloon Rally official site
RidgeWalk & Run official site
Wellsville Creative Arts Center

New York (state) populated places on the Genesee River
Towns in Allegany County, New York